Sudan has several political parties which have very little political power. Opposition parties are allowed, but are widely considered to have no chance of gaining influence.

Main parties
 Democratic Unionist Party (Al Hizb Al-Ittihadi Al-Dimuqrati)
 Umma Party (Hizb al-Umma)
 Umma Party (Reform and Renewal)
 Omom Party
 Sudanese Congress Party (SCP or SCoP) (Hizb al-Mu’tamar al-Sudani)
 Popular Congress Party (Al-Mu'tamar al-Sha’bi)
 Sudanese Ba'ath Party (Hizb al-Ba'ath as-Sudani)
 Sudanese Communist Party (Al-Hizb al-Shuyui al-Sudani)
 Arab Socialist Ba'ath Party – Organisation
 Arab Socialist Ba'ath Party – Country
 Liberal Party of Sudan (Al-Hizb Al-Librali)
 Binaa Sudan Party (Hizb Binaa Al Sudan) 
 Liberal Democrats (Hizb Al-Demokhrateen Al-Ahrar)
 Nubian Front of Liberation (Jabhat al-Tahrir al-Nuwbia)
 National Democratic Alliance
 Sudan National Alliance 
 The National Reform Party 
 Sudanese Unity National Party (S.U.N. PARTY)
 Islamic Socialist Party
 Free People Party (FPP)
 Sudan Democratic Progressive Party

Dissolved parties
 Sudanese Socialist Democratic Union

Banned parties
 National Congress Party

See also
 Politics of Sudan
 List of political parties by country

References

External links
 Sudan Electionnaire
 Hizb ut-Tahrir Media site
 Hizb ut-Tahrir official website

Sudan
 
Political parties
Political parties
Sudan